The 2022 General Tire 200 was the third stock car race of the 2022 ARCA Menards Series season, and the 60th iteration of the event. The race was held on Saturday, April 23, 2022, in Lincoln, Alabama at Talladega Superspeedway, a 2.66 mile (4 km) permanent triangle-shaped superspeedway. The race was decreased from 76 laps to 68 laps, due to a time restraint with the NASCAR Xfinity Series race. At race's end, Nick Sanchez of Rev Racing would win, after Daniel Dye spun on the backstretch with 9 laps to go. This was Sanchez's second career ARCA Menards Series win, and his first of the season. To fill out the podium, Bret Holmes of Bret Holmes Racing and Corey Heim of Venturini Motorsports would finish 2nd and 3rd, respectively. 

The race was marred by a crash involving several drivers, including Richard Garvie, Brayton Laster, Toni Breidinger, Eric Caudell, Scott Melton, Tim Richmond, and barely Ryan Huff. Garvie's car would clip the front of Laster's car, and would result in a near flip for Garvie. Eric Caudell slid across the track, as he tried to avoid the wreck. As he came up onto the track, he would get t-boned by Scott Melton, Ryan Huff would barely get involved in the accident, but would manage an 8th place finish. Safety personnel had to get Melton out of the car, and was taken to a local hospital on a stretcher.

Background 
Talladega Superspeedway, nicknamed “Dega”, and formerly named Alabama International Motor Speedway (AIMS), is a motorsports complex located north of Talladega, Alabama. It is located on the former Anniston Air Force Base in the small city of Lincoln. A tri-oval, the track was constructed in 1969 by the International Speedway Corporation, a business controlled by the France Family. As of 2021, the track hosts the NASCAR Cup Series, NASCAR Xfinity Series, NASCAR Camping World Truck Series, and ARCA Menards Series. Talladega is the longest NASCAR oval, with a length of 2.66 miles (4.281 km), compared to the Daytona International Speedway, which is 2.5 miles (4.0 km) long. The total peak capacity of Talladega is around 175,000 spectators, with the main grandstand capacity being about 80,000.

Entry list 

 (R) denotes rookie driver

 **Withdrew prior to the event.

Practice 
The only 60-minute practice was held on Friday, April 22, at 3:00 PM CST.

Starting lineup 
No qualifying session will be held; instead, the lineup will be determined by the previous season's owner's points and provisionals. As a result, Drew Dollar of Kyle Busch Motorsports won the pole.

Race results

Notes

Standings after the race 

Drivers' Championship standings

Note: Only the first 10 positions are included for the driver standings.

References 

2022 ARCA Menards Series
NASCAR races at Talladega Superspeedway
General Tire 200 (Talladega)
2022 in sports in Alabama